A dillybag or dilly bag is a traditional Australian Aboriginal bag generally woven from plant fibres. Dillybags are mainly designed and used by women to gather and transport food, and are most commonly found in the northern parts of Australia.

Dilly comes from the Jagera word dili, which refers to both the bag and the plants from which it is made. Amongst some Aboriginal peoples dillybags are alternatively known as yakou, yibali, murkutu or but but bags.

Some forms of dillybags are worn like a satchel with a cord around the neck; most come in an oval shape with a cord attached for carrying. Dillybags are normally woven out of vines or tough dried grasses. In Arnhem Land, Queensland, the Northern Territory and northern Western Australia, plant species of the Pandanus genus are often used. They are sometimes lined with feathers or animal fur to stop small pieces of food from falling through holes in the weave. 

Although mainly used by women to gather food, they are sometimes used by men, such as to help carry tools for hunting. Some dillybags are used to hold personal or sacred artefacts. Today these functional items are also produced for artistic purposes.

"Dillybag" is also sometimes used to describe bags that were made and used by non-Aboriginal Australians, for example, a smaller food bag carried by swagmen along with their swags.  The term is also used by Australians to describe similar bags for other purposes.

References

Further reading

Australian Aboriginal bushcraft
Australian inventions
Bags